is a Japanese josei manga written and illustrated by Yun Kōga and serialized in Shueisha's Comic Crimson magazine. The manga tells a story of Hisayoshi, son of opera singer, who meets idol Rima and instantly falls in love with her to the point of obsession.

In January 2010 Viz Media has announced the acquisition of Crown of Love license. The first English volume was released on February 2, 2010.

Plot
After a chance encounter, Hisayoshi "Kumi" Tajima falls madly in love with teen idol Rima Fujio. Bewitched by her beauty, he only wants to get closer to her. As a fan, he lives in a separate world. But if he becomes a fellow idol, maybe things will be different. Thus inspired, he strives to achieve his goal.

Media

Manga

Volume list

References

External links 

1998 manga
Josei manga
Romance anime and manga
Viz Media manga
Shueisha manga
Yun Kōga